Eureeka's Castle is an American children's puppet television series created by Debby Beece and Judy Katschke. It originally aired on Nickelodeon's Nick Jr. block from September 4, 1989, to November 10, 1991. The program featured various puppet characters who live in a giant's wind-up music box. The show was a joint development by Nickelodeon, animators Kit Laybourne and Eli Noyes of Noyes & Laybourne Enterprises, and the puppeteers at 3/Design Studio. R. L. Stine developed the characters and was the head writer for the episodes.

Synopsis
The show follows various puppet characters including Eureeka, a sorceress-in-training. Eureeka and her friends live in a wind-up castle music box owned by a friendly giant. Other characters include Magellan the dragon, twin moat dwellers Bogge and Quagmire, Batly the bat, and Mr. Knack the handyman. There are also various appearing creatures such as mice, singing fish statues called the Fishtones, Magellan's pets Cooey and the Slurms, and Batly's pet spider Webster.

Halfway through the episode, an animated short based on a children's book was shown. Also featured were shorter animated and live-action short films and European imports such as Animal Fair, Roobarb, The Shoe People, Towser, James the Cat, Le Piaf, Plonsters, Philipp, Bojan the Bear, Lilliput Put,  Zeno shorts, 
and Gran. Musical guests also appeared on the show, performing either in one of Mr. Knack's postcards, or at the castle in person.

Characters
 Eureeka (performed and voiced by Cheryl Blaylock) is the title character and protagonist. Eureeka is a friendly sorceress-in-training. Her spells are not successful most of the time, but she keeps trying until she gets it right. Aside from her magic, she usually helps solve her friends' problems.
 Magellan (performed and voiced by Noel MacNeal) is a large green dragon with a tail that has a mind of its own. He does not always understand new concepts. Magellan tends to make great big sneezes that can shake the whole castle whenever he gets upset. He has a mother-son like relationship with Eureeka. According to Eureeka, Magellan will do anything to try and stay awake past bedtime. One talent that Magellan can do is blow bubbles from his mouth.
 Cooey (performed and voiced by Lynn Hippen) is Magellan's pet of indeterminate species.
 Slurms are Magellan's pet worm hybrids.
 Blanketeers are living blue dots on Magellan's blanket.
 Batly (performed and voiced by Jim Kroupa) is an egotistical, clumsy, blue bat who wears glasses due to being nearsighted. Despite being different in every way, he and Magellan are good friends. His flying usually ends with a crash landing prompting him to say "I meant to do that." Batly spends most of his time in the belfry and has a large bug collection. In a 2016 Reddit AMA, R.L. Stine said that Batly's face was modeled after his own son Matt.
 Webster (performed and voiced by Noel MacNeal) is Batly's intimidating pet spider.
 Fred is Batly's lightning bug whom he sleeps with.
 Bogge and Quagmire (performed and voiced by Brian Muehl and Pam Arciero) are the Moat Twins. They are two mischievous squabbling siblings who spend most of their time swimming in the polluted castle moat, eating peanut butter sandwiches, and playing in the basement. Bogge is orange while Quagmire is pink. They're never apart, unless there's a troubling situation. They tend to argue with each other, but work together when it comes to causing trouble. Bogge and Quagmire constantly try to steal Magellan's peanut butter sandwiches, but never succeed. They're capable of moving, talking, breathing, and playing on land or underwater with equal ease. Their favorite game is to challenge each other with tongue-twister statements, at which they are highly proficient. While they spend much of their time bickering, they quickly become bored and then saddened to the point of depression, if even temporarily separated from the other.
 Mr. Knack (performed and voiced by Brian Muehl) is the castle's handyman and tinker. He uses many unconventional methods for fixing things around the castle. Mr. Knack also loves to barter when he sells some of his inventions that he has made from his pushcart. Mr. Knack always gets some postcards which he reads to the viewers. His first name is "Nick", giving him the name Nick Knack.
 Sir Klank (performed and voiced by Jim Kroupa) is a blue mouse with a long gray beard who resides in a suit of armor.
 Kate (performed and voiced by Lynn Hippen) is a pink mouse who frequently reports on what happens in the castle.
 Emma (performed and voiced by Pam Arciero) is an orange mouse who loves to eat.
 The Fishtones are a trio of singing fish in the form of a stone fountain who spray water when they're not singing.
 The Giant (performed and voiced by Jim Kroupa) is a friendly full-bodied giant with a big nose and a long orange beard who owns the wind-up castle music box where the show takes place. Once per episode, he winds up the castle's music box key to introduce the episode's musical guest. The castle inhabitants are aware of his existence, and in rare incidents they attempt to summon his attention.

Puppeteers

Main
 Pam Arciero as Quagmire, Emma
 Cheryl Blaylock as Eureeka
 Lynn Hippen as Cooey, Kate
 Jim Kroupa as Batly, Sir Klank, Giant
 Noel MacNeal as Magellan, Webster
 Brian Muehl as Bogge, Mr. Knack

Additional
 Rob Gardner
 John Kennedy
 Joey Mazzarino

Production
Eureeka's Castle'''s ending credits state the show comes from an original concept by Debby Beece and Judy Katschke. In 1988, development of the show began by staff members at Nickelodeon and animator Eli Noyes and his partner Kit Laybourne, whose wife Geraldine Laybourne was the Head of Programming for Nickelodeon.  "Jovial Bob Stine", best known for his children's horror novels written under the pen name R. L. Stine, was hired as the head writer to develop the concept, characters and episode scripts. The puppet design and construction for the characters were done at 3/Design Studio where the puppets were built by Jim Kroupa, John Orberg, Kip Rathke and Matt Stoddart.

Nickelodeon ordered 65 episodes of Eureeka's Castle, and Beece called it "the most ambitious program for preschoolers since the premiere of Sesame Street 20 years ago". The first episode of Eureeka's Castle premiered during Nickelodeon's Special Delivery block on August 27, 1989, before debuting on Nick Jr. on September 4. In May 1990, Eureeka's Castle was renewed for a 35-episode second season.

From 1990 to 1991, Nickelodeon created 52 half-hour episodes of Eureeka's Castle entirely out of clips from the first two seasons for their participation in the Cable in the Classroom service. Some episodes did not include acquired shorts and musical guest segments, while others included some of them. The half-hour episodes were designed for international distribution and later replaced the original hour-long episodes in reruns starting in 1994. Production on Eureeka's Castle ended in 1991; some of the show's crew later worked on Gullah Gullah Island.

Episodes

Series overview

Season 1 (1989)

Season 2 (1990–1991)

Season 3 (1990–1991)

Specials (1990–1991)

Broadcast
The series premiered on September 4, 1989 on Nick Jr. Reruns of the show continued airing on Nick Jr. until July 12, 1996, and again from November 16, 1998, to January 29, 1999, and on Noggin from February 2, 1999, to September 6, 2000.

Home video
Two Eureeka's Castle direct-to-video specials ("Sing Along with Eureeka" and "Wide Awake at Eureeka's Castle", both produced in 1990) and the "Christmas at Eureeka's Castle" special were released by Sony Wonder in 1995, and Paramount Home Video in 1997. While some episodes were released on VHS, the series has not been released on DVD or Blu-ray.

On April 21, 2021, 26 half-hour episodes of the show were added to Paramount+. This marks the first time the series had been legally available to watch in 19 years.

Awards
In 1990, Eureeka's Castle'' won an Ace Award for best children's program.

See also
 The Puzzle Place
 Bear in the Big Blue House
 Sesame Street
 Wimzie's House
 Allegra's Window
 Gullah Gullah Island
 Barney & Friends

References

External links

 
 Eureeka's Castle at Paramount Plus

1989 American television series debuts
1991 American television series endings
1980s American children's television series
1990s American children's television series
1980s American music television series
1990s American music television series
1980s Nickelodeon original programming
1990s Nickelodeon original programming
1980s preschool education television series
1990s preschool education television series
American children's fantasy television series
American children's musical television series
American preschool education television series
American television series with live action and animation
American television shows featuring puppetry
English-language television shows
Nick Jr. original programming
Television series about dragons
Television series by CBS Studios
R. L. Stine